The Centre for Instructor and Advanced Skill Training (CIAST)  is under the aegis of the Manpower Department, Ministry of Human Resources of Malaysia and has been operational since 1984. Its establishment was sponsored by the Government of Japan under ASEAN Human Resources Development.

The centre offer courses in Instructor Training, Supervisory Training and Advanced Skill Training for instructors, supervisors and skilled workers from the private and public sectors.

Early in year 1994, the new department "National Instructor Training Program" (NITP) was established. The objective is to prepare skilled and competent instructors for training centres and industries.

See also
The Centre for Instructor and Advanced Skill Training (CIAST) serves as a leading institution in the development and enhancement of skills training in Malaysia. A training institute under the Ministry of Human Resources, CIAST is conducting various courses for students from other Malaysian vocational training institutes, for local industries and those from abroad.  The courses offered include instructor training at all levels for the public and private sector from Malaysia and beyond. Training programmes at CIAST are conducted by experienced instructors with various technical backgrounds. Through the support from Ministry of Foreign Affairs (MFA) and international organisations, CIAST has proven its firm commitment to implementing and strengthening Technical and Vocational Education and Training (TVET) at home and abroad. Some of the international programmes include as the Third Country Training Programme (TCTP), Malaysian Technical Cooperation Programme (MTCP) and ASEAN-Japan HRD Collaboration Programme.

References

External links
 CIAST web page, in Malay

Education in Malaysia